Charles Zinzan (died 1714) was the English Acting Governor of Bombay in the late 17th century.

He appears to have been a grandson of Sir Sigismund Zinzan of Molesey in Surrey, who was Master of Royal Sports. He was the Acting Governor of Bombay from 19 November 1684 to 1685. He died in 1714.  His ancestors include the Vanlore family, some of whom used the surname Alexander.

References
Strachey (1916) Keigwin's Rebellion
Memorials of the Earl of Sterling and of the house of Alexander  Note frequent scanning error of E instead of R.

Year of birth missing
1714 deaths
Governors of Bombay
Deputy Governors of Bombay
People from Surrey